Luis David Montero Carrasco (born April 6, 1993) is a Dominican professional basketball player for Las Fieras de La Villa in the Dominican Republic's Liga Nacional de Baloncesto. He was considered one of the top National Junior College Athletic Association players in the United States while at Westchester Community College in Valhalla, New York.

Early life and career
A native of Santo Domingo, Dominican Republic, Montero played high school basketball at Wilbraham & Monson Academy in Massachusetts. He then played college basketball for Westchester Community College in 2013–14 and averaged 15.6 points, 5.9 rebounds and 3.0 assists per game. He returned to Westchester for the 2014–15 season but their season was cancelled due to transcript issues. In January 2015, he enrolled at South Plains College with the goal of playing for them in 2015–16. However, in April 2015, he declared for the 2015 NBA draft.

Professional career

Portland Trail Blazers (2015–2016)
After going undrafted in the 2015 NBA draft, Montero joined the Portland Trail Blazers for the 2015 NBA Summer League. On July 11, 2015, he signed with the Trail Blazers. He made his NBA debut on October 30 in a loss to the Phoenix Suns, recording one rebound in two minutes of action. On March 10, 2016, using the flexible assignment rule, he was assigned to the Santa Cruz Warriors, the D-League affiliate of the Golden State Warriors. On March 20, he was recalled by Portland. On October 15, 2016, he was waived by the Trail Blazers.

NBA D League (2016–17)
On October 18, 2016, Montero signed with the Miami Heat, but was waived on October 22 after appearing in two preseason games. On November 1, 2016, he was acquired by the Sioux Falls Skyforce of the NBA Development League as an affiliate player of the Heat. On March 2, 2017, Montero was traded to the Reno Bighorns.

NBA D League and return to South America (2017–18)
Montero was signed to a two-way contract by the Detroit Pistons of the NBA. Under the terms of the deal, he split time between the Pistons and their G-League affiliate, the Grand Rapids Drive. On January 13, 2018, Montero was waived by the Detroit Pistons.

On January 27, 2018, Montero was reacquired by the Reno Bighorns, but was waived in March.

In March 2018, Montero signed with El Millõn Yireh, a basketball team in the second tier of the Dominican Basketball League Torebonde Baloncesto Superior (TBS). He made his debut on March 27, in a 87-74 loss to Huellas del Siglo, and left the club at the end of the year.

Poland and Mexico (2018–19)
On August 9, 2018, Montero signed with Anwil Włocławek of the Polish Basketball League. After a few days Montero was fired by Anwil due to his failure to undergo medical tests. On January 11, 2019, Montero was reported to have signed with Capitanes de Ciudad de México of the Liga Nacional de Baloncesto Profesional (LNBP) for one month.

Argentina (2019–present)
In October 2019, Montero signed with Argentinian team Club Atlético Platense.

In October 2020, he signed with San Lorenzo of the Liga Nacional de Básquet, Argentina.

NBA career statistics

Regular season

|-
| style="text-align:left;"| 
| style="text-align:left;"| Portland 
| 12 || 0 || 3.5 || .263 || .111 || .750 || .3 || .1 || .0 || .0 || 1.2
|-
| style="text-align:left;"| 
| style="text-align:left;"| Detroit 
| 2 || 0 || 4.0 || .000 || .000 || .000 || 1.0 || .0 || .0 || .0 || 0.0
|-class="sortbottom"
| style="text-align:center;" colspan="2"| Career
| 14 || 0 || 3.6 || .250 || .111 || .750 || .4 || .1 || .0 || .0 || 1.0

Playoffs

|-
| style="text-align:left;"| 2016
| style="text-align:left;"| Portland
| 6 || 0 || 1.3 || 1.000 || 1.000 || .000 || .0 || .0 || .0 || .0 || 1.3
|-class="sortbottom"
| style="text-align:center;" colspan="2"| Career 
| 6 || 0 || 1.3 || 1.000 || 1.000 || .000 || .0 || .0 || .0 || .0 || 1.3

Legal issues
Montero was arrested on October 25, 2018. He was charged with lewd and lavicious battery on a child and interfering with custody after he met with a 13-year old girl at a Miami hotel for sex.

References

External links

Luis Montero at nbadraft.net

1993 births
Living people
2019 FIBA Basketball World Cup players
Basketball players at the 2019 Pan American Games
Capitanes de Ciudad de México players
Cocodrilos de Caracas players
Detroit Pistons players
Dominican Republic men's basketball players
Grand Rapids Drive players
Junior college men's basketball players in the United States
Leones de Ponce basketball players
National Basketball Association players from the Dominican Republic
Pan American Games competitors for the Dominican Republic
Portland Trail Blazers players
Reno Bighorns players
Santa Cruz Warriors players
Shooting guards
Sioux Falls Skyforce players
South Plains College alumni
Undrafted National Basketball Association players